Abu Hasem Khan Choudhury (born 12 January 1938) is an Indian politician and former Union Minister of State for Health and Family Welfare. He has represented the Maldaha Dakshin (Lok Sabha constituency) since 2009. He first elected M.P from his brother A.B.A. Ghani Khan Choudhury's seat Malda (Lok Sabha constituency) as a member of the Indian National Congress party.

Early life
A.H Khan was born into a Bengali Muslim family in Malda district, West Bengal. His father, Khan Bahadur Abu Hayat B. Khan Choudhury was a Zamindar in Malda district during British Raj.

Political career
Khan served MLA of Kaliachak from 1996 to 2006.After his brother A.B.A. Ghani Khan Choudhury death's he was elected to M.P from Malda (Lok Sabha constituency) as a member of the Indian National Congress party. From 22 September 2012 to 16 May 2014 he served as Union Minister of State for Health and Family Welfare under UPA Government.

References

Indian National Congress politicians from West Bengal
Living people
People from Malda district
India MPs 2009–2014
1938 births
Lok Sabha members from West Bengal
India MPs 2014–2019
University of Calcutta alumni
India MPs 2004–2009
India MPs 2019–present
20th-century Bengalis
21st-century Bengalis
Deputy opposition leaders